Someren is a municipality and town in the province of North Brabant in the Southern Netherlands. As of January 2019, the municipality had 19,322 inhabitants, with over half of the population residing in the town. Someren, just south of Helmond and to the north of Weert, Limburg, is located on the provincial border with Limburg.

The spoken dialect is Peellands (an East Brabantian dialect, which is very similar to colloquial Dutch). In Brabantian, Someren is known as Zummere.

Population centres

Topography

Dutch Topographic map of the municipality of Someren, June 2015

Notable people 
 Antonius Lambertus Maria Hurkmans (born 1944 in Someren) Bishop emeritus of the Roman Catholic Diocese of 's-Hertogenbosch
 Marie-José de Groot (born 1966 in Someren) a Dutch rower, competed at the 1992 Summer Olympics
 Vincent Voorn (born 1984 in Someren) a Dutch show jumper, competed in the 2008 Summer Olympics
 Evy Kuijpers (born 1995 in Lierop) a Dutch professional racing cyclist

Gallery

References

External links

Official website

 
Municipalities of North Brabant
Populated places in North Brabant